Tilbury Marine railway station served the town of Tilbury, historically in Essex, England, from 1896 to 1932 on the Tilbury Marine branch of the London, Tilbury and Southend Railway.

History
The station was opened on 17 April 1886 by the London and St Katharine Dock Company. Its first services were boat train specials. This wasn't successful and the station was out of use by December 1906. It was reopened and refurbished by the London, Midland and Scottish Railway on 15 May 1927, only to close permanently on 1 May 1932.

References

Disused railway stations in Essex
Railway stations in Great Britain opened in 1896
Railway stations in Great Britain closed in 1906
Railway stations in Great Britain opened in 1927
Railway stations in Great Britain closed in 1932
1896 establishments in England
1932 disestablishments in England
Tilbury
Transport in Thurrock